Cyperus acholiensis is a species of sedge that is endemic to an area in northern Uganda.

See also
 List of Cyperus species

References

acholiensis
Plants described in 2011